The Singles is a compilation album by the English punk rock band the Clash. It includes all of the band's singles, in their original single versions, except for 1977's Capital Radio (which, whilst not eligible for chart entry due to being a free EP, is still considered a single) and 1985's "This Is England", due to its parent album, Cut the Crap (1985), being disowned by the band at that time.

This collection contains the actual A-side recording of the "This Is Radio Clash" single. Other compilations, such as Super Black Market Clash (1993) and The Essential Clash (2003), contain the B-side "Radio Clash" under the title "This Is Radio Clash" instead.

A remastered version, with slightly altered artwork, was released in 1999 as part of Sony's Clash reissue campaign.

Track listing
All tracks by Joe Strummer and Mick Jones, except where noted.

 "White Riot" – 1:57
 "Remote Control" – 2:58
 "Complete Control" – 3:11
 "Clash City Rockers" – 3:46
 "(White Man) In Hammersmith Palais" – 3:58
 "Tommy Gun" – 3:13
 "English Civil War" (Trad arr. Strummer/Jones) – 2:34
 "I Fought the Law" (Sonny Curtis) – 2:38
 "London Calling" – 3:17
 "Train in Vain" – 3:06
 "Bankrobber" – 4:32
 "The Call Up" (Strummer/Jones/Paul Simonon/Topper Headon) – 5:21
 "Hitsville U.K." (Strummer/Jones/Simonon/Headon) – 4:19
 "The Magnificent Seven" (Strummer/Jones/Simonon/Headon) – 4:26
 "This Is Radio Clash" (Strummer/Jones/Simonon/Headon) – 4:08
 "Know Your Rights" – 3:35
 "Rock the Casbah" (Strummer/Jones/Headon) – 3:35
 "Should I Stay or Should I Go" (Strummer/Jones/Simonon/Headon) – 3:08

Charts

Weekly charts

Year-end charts

References 

The Clash compilation albums
1991 compilation albums
Epic Records compilation albums